The men's 4 x 400 metres relay at the 2006 European Athletics Championships were held at the Ullevi on August 12 and August 13.

France and Great Britain both overtook the Polish team in the home straight to finish 1st and 2nd respectively.

Medalists

*Athletes who competed in heats only

Schedule

Results

Heats
First 3 in each heat (Q) and the next 2 fastest (q) advance to the Final.

Final

External links
Results

Relay 4 x 400
4 x 400 metres relay at the European Athletics Championships